An election to Monmouthshire County Council took place on 5 May 2022 as part of the 2022 Welsh local elections.

The Welsh Conservatives lost overall control of the council, whilst the Lib Dems were wiped out. The Greens elected their first councillor in Monmouthshire in the Llantilio Crossenny ward.

The election took place on the basis of revised ward boundaries, and an increase in the number of councillors from 43 to 46.

Results

Ward results

Bulwark and Thornwell

Caerwent

Caldicot Castle

Caldicot Cross

Cantref

Castle

Chepstow Castle & Larkfield

Croesonen

Crucorney

Devauden

Dewstow

Osbaston

Drybridge

Gobion Fawr

References

Monmouthshire
Monmouthshire County Council elections
21st century in Monmouthshire